(born December 4, 1989) is a Japanese professional wrestler currently signed to New Japan Pro-Wrestling (NJPW) where he is a member of the Los Ingobernables de Japón stable and current IWGP Jr. Heavyweight Champion in his fifth reign.

Takahashi made his debut for NJPW on August 28, 2010, and worked as a "Young Lion" over the following three years. In January 2014, Takahashi, renamed , was sent to the Mexican Consejo Mundial de Lucha Libre (CMLL) promotion to further his wrestling training and gain international experience, a tradition with NJPW "Young Lions". In January 2016, he won his first professional wrestling championship, the CMLL World Lightweight Championship. After leaving CMLL he worked for the American Ring of Honor (ROH) until the fall of 2016, with Takahashi returning to NJPW in November 2016, once again working under his real name. Since his return, Takahashi has become a five-time IWGP Junior Heavyweight Champion and a record four-time Best of the Super Juniors tournament winner (2018, 2020, 2021, 2022).

Early life
Takahashi was born on December 4, 1989, in Hachiōji, a city in Tokyo. At the age of 12 he became a fan of professional wrestling, especially Masahiro Chono, who inspired Takahashi to work hard in school to become a member of the track and field team.

Professional wrestling career
Takahashi attended New Japan Pro-Wrestling's (NJPW) annual open tryout test in May 2009. He passed the test and was accepted into the NJPW Dojo, where he trained in the same class as King Fale and Kyosuke Mikami, who all made their in-ring debut around the same time.

New Japan Pro-Wrestling (2010–2013)
Takahashi was the last of the three NJPW Dojo class of 2010 to debut for NJPW on August 24, 2010, at the NEVER.1 show. He was defeated by Mikami in a short opening match. Takahashi followed the traditions of NJPW's "Young Lions" (their term for rookies), wrestling in all black trunks and boots, usually losing the majority of their matches as part of their ongoing training regiment. Takahashi would lose every match he competed in until February 6, 2011, when he teamed up with Tomoaki Honma to finally win a match, defeating Fale and Mikami. Three weeks later, exactly six months after his debut, Takahashi finally won his first ever singles match as he defeated Kazuki Hirata of the Dramatic Dream Team (DDT) promotion at NEVER.5. A few months later Takahashi was given an opportunity to compete for a spot in NJPW's annual Best of the Super Juniors tournament as he participated in the 2011 "Road to the Super Juniors" tournament, but was defeated in the first round by another DDT representative, Keisuke Ishii. On October 10, 2011, Takahashi and Mikami teamed up to defeat King Fale and Takaaki Watanabe in the dark match of the Destruction '11 pay-per-view event. In 2012 Black Tiger had originally qualified for the 2012 Best of Super Juniors, but was forced to withdraw from the tournament with Takahashi being named as his replacement. During the tournament Takahashi lost to Alex Koslov, Daisuke Sasaki, Brian Kendrick, Jado, Low Ki, Ryusuke Taguchi, and Tiger Mask and only defeated Taka Michinoku. He would later team up with fellow "Young Lions" Mikami & Takaaki Watanabe to compete in the "J Sports Crown Openweight 6 Man Tag Tournament". The team lost to Madoka, Shinobu & Tsuyoshi Kikuchi in their first round match. On January 4, 2013, Takahashi competed in his first ever January 4 Dome Show, when he wrestled in a dark match of Wrestle Kingdom 7, teaming up with Jyushin Thunder Liger & Tiger Mask, losing to the team of Bushi, Kushida & Ryusuke Taguchi. During the summer of 2013 he was once again allowed to compete in the annual Best of Super Juniors, but lost all matches, taking pinfalls against Jyushin Thunder Liger, Prince Devitt, Titán, Taichi, Ricochet, Beretta, Rocky Romero, and Alex Shelley. NJPW often sends their "Young Lions" on a learning excursion outside Japan, be it the United States of America, Europe or Mexico, and in the summer of 2013 it was Takahashi's turn. Initially he traveled to the United Kingdom where he worked regularly for a number of local British independent wrestling promotions.

Consejo Mundial de Lucha Libre (2014–2016)
Like his former wrestling school partner Mikami before him, Takahashi then traveled to Mexico to work with NJPW's partner promotion, Consejo Mundial de Lucha Libre (CMLL) for an extended stay. During his stay in Mexico, he was given a new wrestling persona, a masked "heel" or rudo character called Kamaitachi, named after a Japanese supernatural monster, which his mask resembled. Much like Mikami before him, Takahashi was teamed up with CMLL's resident Japanese worker Okumura as part of La Fiebre Amarilla ("The Yellow Fever"). La Fiebre Amarilla primarily worked on the lower half of the show and often in six-man tag team matches. On July 13, 2014, Kamaitachi & Okumura challenged for the CMLL Arena Coliseo Tag Team Championship, but were defeated by champions Delta & Guerrero Maya Jr. In early 2015, Kamaitachi started a storyline rivalry with Dragon Lee. The rivalry culminated on March 20 at Homenaje a Dos Leyendas, where Kamaitachi was defeated by Lee in a Mask vs. Mask Lucha de Apuestas. As per stipulation, Kamaitachi unmasked following the loss, revealing himself as Hiromu Takahashi. On May 1, Kamaitachi participated in the 2015 Reyes del Aire, where he and Dragon Lee eliminated each other via a double pin. On May 15, Kamaitachi was eliminated by Místico in the first round torneo cibernetico of the 2015 Leyenda de Plata ("Silver Legend") tournament. On July 13, Kamaitachi unsuccessfully challenged Dragon Lee for the CMLL World Lightweight Championship.

On January 23, 2016, Takahashi, billed as Kamaitachi, made a surprise return to NJPW during a CMLL and NJPW co-produced Fantastica Mania 2016 event, attacking Dragon Lee and challenging him to a title match. This marked his first NJPW appearance since May 2013. At the following day's Fantastica Mania 2016 event, Kamaitachi defeated Dragon Lee to win his first professional wrestling title, the CMLL World Lightweight Championship. Following the match, Kamaitachi stated that he was not yet returning to NJPW, but would travel back to CMLL. On March 4, back in Mexico City, Kamaitachi lost the title back to Dragon Lee. The following month, it was reported that Takahashi was done with CMLL and had moved to the United States.

Ring of Honor (2016)
On April 30, 2016, Kamaitachi made his debut for Ring of Honor (ROH), losing to A. C. H. On May 20, Kamaitachi made his debut for Pro Wrestling Guerrilla (PWG), losing to Michael Elgin. On September 3, Kamaitachi entered PWG's 2016 Battle of Los Angeles tournament, but was eliminated in his first round match by Trevor Lee. On June 24, 2016, Kamaitachi made his pay-per-view debut with Ring of Honor at Best In The World, losing to Kyle O'Reilly by submission. On September 30, 2016, at ROH's All Star Extravaganza VIII, Kamaitachi lost to his old rival in CMLL, the debuting Dragon Lee.

Return to NJPW (2016–present)

In August 2016, a cryptic video started appearing on NJPW programming featuring a time bomb counting down to November 5, 2016. On November 5, 2016, at Power Struggle, Takahashi, once again working under his real name, made a surprise appearance after Kushida had defeated Bushi to regain the IWGP Junior Heavyweight Championship, challenging the new champion to a match at Wrestle Kingdom 11 in Tokyo Dome. On December 10, at the World Tag League finals, Takahashi accepted Tetsuya Naito's offer to join the Los Ingobernables de Japón (L.I.J.) stable. Takahashi wrestled his NJPW return match on December 16, pinning Kushida in a tag team main event, where he and Naito defeated Kushida & Hiroshi Tanahashi. On January 4, 2017, at Wrestle Kingdom 11 in Tokyo Dome, Takahashi defeated Kushida to win the IWGP Junior Heavyweight Championship for the first time. He made his first successful title defense on February 11 at The New Beginning in Osaka against Dragon Lee. His next defense took place on March 6 at NJPW's 45th anniversary event, where he defeated Ryusuke Taguchi. Takahashi made his third defense on April 9 at Sakura Genesis 2017, defeating Kushida in just one minute and 56 seconds. His fourth successful defense took place against Ricochet on April 29. Takahashi suffered his first loss since his return to Japan on May 17, when he was defeated by longtime rival Dragon Lee in his opening match in the 2017 Best of the Super Juniors tournament. Takahashi suffered further losses in the tournament against Ricochet and Will Ospreay and failed to advance to the finals with a record of four wins and three losses. On June 11 at Dominion 6.11 in Osaka-jo Hall, Takahashi lost the IWGP Junior Heavyweight Championship to the winner of the tournament, Kushida.

In late 2017, Takahashi started teaming regularly with L.I.J. stablemate Bushi in NJPW's junior tag team division. On October 23, the two defeated Dragon Lee & Titán in the first round of the 2017 Super Jr. Tag Tournament. They were eliminated from the tournament in the semifinals on October 30 by eventual winners Roppongi 3K (Sho & Yoh). At Wrestle Kingdom 12, he competed in a fatal-four-way match for the IWGP Junior Heavyweight Championship,  but was unsuccessful. Alongside Bushi, he was challenged for the Jr. Tag Team Championships but was unfortunately unsuccessful in the process. He then competed in the Best of the Super Juniors 2018, winning his block with five wins and two losses, defeating rival Kushida, and advancing to the finals. On June 4, Takahashi defeated Taiji Ishimori in the finals to win the 2018 Best Of The Super Juniors. The match received a 5 1/2 Star rating from Dave Meltzer. At Dominion 6.9 in Osaka-jo-Hall, Takahashi defeated Will Ospreay to win the IWGP Junior Heavyweight Championship for a second time. On July 7, 2018 at the G1 Special in San Francisco, Takahashi successfully defended his title against Dragon Lee, but it was reported after the match that Takahashi had suffered a broken neck because of a botched Phoenix-Plex. It was reported that Takahashi would miss up 9 to 12 months of action due to the severity of the injury, and as a result, the title was declared vacant on August 20.

On November 3, 2019 at Power Struggle, Takahashi returned to NJPW to challenge Will Ospreay to a match at Wrestle Kingdom 14 for the Junior Heavyweight Championship, which Ospreay accepted. His return match took place on December 19, 2019, during the Road to Tokyo Dome event, 530 days after his last match, with he and Bushi losing to Ospreay & Robbie Eagles. On January 4, 2020 at Wrestle Kingdom 14, Takahashi defeated Ospreay to capture the IWGP Junior Heavyweight Championship for the third time in his career. On the second night of the event, he teamed up with Ryu Lee to defeat Jushin Thunder Liger & Naoki Sano, in what was Liger's retirement match; after pinning Liger to win the match, Takahashi vowed to him that he would continue the legacy of the junior heavyweight division that Liger had started. At Summer Struggle in Jingu, he lost the title to Ishimori after holding the title for 238 days.

In June, Takahashi entered the New Japan Cup for the first time. Despite being a Junior Heavyweight, Takahashi established heavyweight stars, such as Toru Yano and Tomohiro Ishii to advance to the semifinals. In the semi-finals, Takahashi was defeated by Kazuchika Okada. Takahashi would be announced as a participant in the Best of the Super Jr. tournament, which he won after defeating El Desperado in the finals. Immediately after, he called out the winner of the Super J-Cup (won by El Phantasmo), to a match at Wrestle Kingdom 15, where the winner would go on to face Taiji Ishimori for the IWGP Junior Heavyweight Championship on the second night. On night one of Wrestle Kingdom, Takahashi defeated Phantasmo, and on night two, he defeated Ishimori, beginning his fourth reign with the Junior Heavyweight Championship. However, Takahashi would suffer a torn pectoral muscle, vacating the title on February 25, 2021.  On July 25 at Wrestle Grand Slam in Tokyo Dome, Takahashi made his return from injury, announcing that he was medically cleared to return to in-ring competition, before challenging the winner of the IWGP Junior Heavyweight Championship match between El Desperado and Robbie Eagles. Later that night, Eagles defeated Desperado to win the IWGP Junior Heavyweight Championship, setting up his match against Takahashi. On August 27, Takahashi made his in-ring return from injury defeating DOUKI. On September 5 at Wrestle Grand Slam in MetLife Dome Night 2, Takahashi unsuccessfully challenged Robbie Eagles for the IWGP Junior Heavyweight Championship. From November 13 until December 11, Takahashi took part in the 2021 Best of the Super Juniors, finishing the tournament with a record of seven wins, three losses, and a draw, advancing to the finals of the tournament. On December 15, Takahashi defeated Yoh in the finals to win the 2021 Best of the Super Juniors for the third time in the longest match of the tournament's history, while also becoming the second wrestler in the tournament's history to win back-to-back finals after Tiger Mask IV in 2004 and 2005. Takahashi received his title shot on Night 1 of Wrestle Kingdom 16, where he lost to Junior Heavyweight Champion El Desperado. On Night 2, Los Ingobernables de Japon defeated Suzuki-Gun in a 6-man tag-team match.

Takahashi once again entered the New Japan Cup in March, once again having an impressive showing against heavyweight stars, defeating Minoru Suzuki and the NEVER Openweight Champion Evil. In the quarterfinals, Takahashi lost to stablemate, Shingo Takagi. Due to his win over Evil, Takahashi received a NEVER Openweight Championship match at Hyper Battle, but was defeated. In May, Takahashi entered the Best of the Super Juniors, topping the A Block with 12 points. He once again met El Desperado in the finals, where he was victorious, therefore becoming the record winner of the tournament with four victories and breaking the record for the most amount of consecutive tournament wins at 3. Takahashi received his IWGP Junior Heavyweight Championship match at NJPW Road, but failed to win the championship from Taiji Ishimori. In June Takahashi and Takagi were scheduled to team with Darby Allin and Sting at AEW x NJPW: Forbidden Door, however Takahashi was pulled from the card after suffering from a fever. Instead in July, Takahashi made his NJPW Strong debut in the USA, losing in a three-way match to El Desperado and Blake Christian. Takahashi defeated Christian once again at Music City Mayhem, a few days later. On January 4 2023 at Wrestle Kingdom 17, Takahashi defeated Master Wato, El Desperado and champion Taiji Ishimori to capture the IWGP Junior Heavyweight Championship in a four-way match, for a fifth time.

Championships and accomplishments

Consejo Mundial de Lucha Libre
CMLL World Lightweight Championship (1 time)
New Japan Pro-Wrestling
IWGP Junior Heavyweight Championship (5 times, current)
Best of the Super Juniors (2018, 2020, 2021, 2022)
Pro Wrestling Illustrated
Ranked No. 27 of the top 500 singles wrestlers in the PWI 500 in 2018
Tokyo Sports
Fighting Spirit Award (2020)
WhatCulture Pro Wrestling
Pro Wrestling World Cup Japanese Qualifying (2017) - with Kushida
Wrestling Observer Newsletter
Best Gimmick (2017)  as part of Los Ingobernables de Japón
Non-Heavyweight MVP (2020)

Luchas de Apuestas record

References

External links

1989 births
Expatriate professional wrestlers in Mexico
Japanese male professional wrestlers
Living people
Masked wrestlers
People from Hachiōji, Tokyo
Sportspeople from Tokyo
IWGP Junior Heavyweight champions
CMLL World Lightweight Champions
21st-century professional wrestlers